The Annual Review of Control, Robotics, and Autonomous Systems is an annual peer-reviewed scientific journal published by Annual Reviews. In publication since 2018, the journal covers developments in the engineering of autonomous and semiautonomous systems through an annual volume of review articles. It is edited by Naomi Ehrich Leonard. According to the Journal Citation Reports, the journal has a 2021 impact factor of 11.943.

History
The journal was first published in 2018 by publisher Annual Reviews, making it their 49th journal title. Its founding editor was Naomi Ehrich Leonard.

Abstracting and indexing
According to the Journal Citation Reports, the journal has a 2021 impact factor of 11.943, ranking it second of 82 journal titles in the category "Automation and Control Systems" and second of 41 journal titles in the category "Robotics". It is abstracted and indexed in the Science Citation Index Expandedand Inspec.

Editorial processes
The journal is helmed by the editor or the co-editors. The editor is assisted by the editorial committee, which includes associate editors, regular members, and occasionally guest editors. Guest members participate at the invitation of the editor, and serve terms of one year. All other members of the editorial committee are appointed by the Annual Reviews board of directors and serve five-year terms. The editorial committee determines which topics should be included in each volume and solicits reviews from qualified authors. Unsolicited manuscripts are not accepted. Peer review of invited manuscripts is undertaken by the editorial committee.

References

External links

 

Control, Robotics, and Autonomous Systems
Annual journals
Publications established in 2018
English-language journals
Robotics journals